"Mic Checka" is a song by American hip hop group Das EFX recorded for their debut album Dead Serious (1992). The song was released as the second single for the album in July 1992.

Track listings
12", Vinyl
"Mic Checka" (Remix) - 5:08
"Mic Checka" (Remix Instrumental) - 5:10
"Mic Checka" (LP Version) - 4:55
"Jussumen" (Remix) - 4:54
"Jussumen" (Remix Instrumental) - 4:56

CD
"Mic Checka" (Edit) - 4:06
"Mic Checka" (Remix Edit) - 4:10
"Mic Checka" (LP Version) - 4:52
"Mic Checka" (Remix) - 5:07

Personnel
Information taken from Discogs.
executive production: EPMD
production: Solid Scheme (Chris Charity, Derek Lynch)
remixing: Pete Rock & C.L. Smooth, Solid Scheme

Chart performance

Covers
The song was covered by Methodman and Redman as "Cheka," though with largely new lyrics.

Notes

1992 singles
Das EFX songs
1992 songs
East West Records singles
Atlantic Records singles